Sólheimajökull is a glacier in southern Iceland, between the volcanoes Katla and Eyjafjallajökull. Part of the larger Mýrdalsjökull glacier, Sólheimajökull is a prominent and popular tourist location owing to its size and relative ease of access.

Geology 
Sólheimajökull is an outlet glacier of the larger Mýrdalsjökull ice cap which lies atop the Katla caldera. It sits near the town of Vík í Mýrdal, a popular tourist location about 180km southeast of Reykjavik. The glacier is melting rapidly owing to warmer annual temperatures due to climate change. It is possible that many of the country's glaciers will become extinct within the next century.

References 

Glaciers of Iceland